Killarney Heights is a suburb of Northern Sydney, situated on Middle Harbour, in the state of New South Wales, Australia. Killarney Heights is 12 kilometres north-east of the Sydney central business district in the local government area of Northern Beaches Council. Killarney Heights is part of the Forest District, colloquially known as The Forest.

Killarney Heights has panoramic views of Middle Harbour from a few locations. The suburb is located on a peninsula bound by the waters of Middle Harbour to the south-west towards Roseville Chase and Bantry Bay to the east. Garigal National Park is on the eastern border.

Schools
There are two schools in Killarney Heights and many more around the area. Killarney Heights Primary School is situated across the road from Killarney Heights Oval. This primary school is noted as having an extensive English - French bilingual program which has led to many French speaking parents moving to the area. A preschool is also nearby. Killarney Heights High School is situated next to the oval, and also has a strong French presence. The High School is a coeducational, comprehensive high school located on Starkey Street, the school has a strong tradition of high academic achievement, catering for individual student needs and providing a broad co-curricular program.

Transport
Killarney Heights is accessible by road, via Warringah Road. Access to Warringah Road is via Roseville Bridge, via Spit Bridge and Wakehurst Parkway or via Forest Way. Killarney Heights is about 20mins from the city during non peak hours. The only public transport around this area is through a private bus company, Forest Coach Lines. Routes that go through Killarney Heights include services to and from the City and Chatswood.

History
Prior to the arrival of the First Fleet, the area was inhabited by the Aboriginal Cadigal peoples. It also got its name from a town in the County Kerry region of southwest Ireland.

The suburb was originally part of Forestville and the area was developed from the 1950s as South Forestville and Heidelberg. The suburb east of Starkey Street became the site of considerable development by LJ Hooker in the early 1960s prior to the completion of the second Roseville Bridge in 1966. West of Starkey Street was Crown land.

Killarney Heights Post Office opened on 1 December 1965 and closed in 1987.

In February 1979, a Lithuanian couple who believed they were being chased by Soviet agents were discovered in bushland adjacent to the suburb. Stepan Petrosys (81) and his 68-year-old wife were discovered after having lived in a cave for 28 years. Local children who frequented the bush knew of these people as early as 1960.

A guide book called "Killarney Heights - Secrets of a Sleepy suburb" was published in November 2022.  The book is an A-Z of fascinating facts, interesting insights and hyper-local heritage.

Heritage listings 
Killarney Heights has a number of heritage-listed sites, including:
 Bantry Bay Explosives Depot
 Killarney Picnic Grounds
 Flat Rock Landing
 Soldiers Rock Landing
 Bantry Bay Reservoir
 Timber Getters Picnic Spot
 Old Bullock Track

Population
In the 2016 Census, there were 4,469 people in Killarney Heights. 63.3% of people were born in Australia. The most common countries of birth were England 6.4%, China 3.7% and Hong Kong 2.2%. 72.0% of people only spoke English at home. Other languages spoken at home included French 5.6%, Cantonese 4.1%, Mandarin 3.9% and Armenian 2.5%.  The most common responses for religion were No Religion 36.0%, Catholic 20.7% and Anglican 17.2%.

References
The Book of Sydney Suburbs, Compiled by Frances Pollon, Angus & Robertson Publishers, 1990, p. 137
Killarney Heights - Secrets of a Sleepy Suburb by Dan Haigh, 2022, ISBN 978-1-922629-74-6

Suburbs of Sydney
Northern Beaches Council